Hypsopygia nonusalis is a species of snout moth in the genus Hypsopygia. It was described by Francis Walker in 1859 and is known from Malaysia, India, Sri Lanka and Taiwan.

References

Moths described in 1859
Pyralini